Misimoa Benjamin Lam (born 9 June 1991) is a New Zealand professional rugby union player. He won a Glasgow Commonwealth Games silver medal in 2014 in the Rugby sevens. His usual playing positions are Wing and Fullback.

Career
Lam played wing for Mitre 10 Cup team Auckland. He was selected for the Auckland and Blues sides in 2012. He played 12 games for Auckland after making his debut in 2012 against Hawke's Bay. He made one Super Rugby appearance for the Auckland Blues in 2012. In November 2012 he entered into a contract as a New Zealand sevens player, making his debut at the Dubai Sevens. Lam won a silver Commonwealth Games Medal as a member of the All Black Sevens team at the Glasgow Commonwealth Games in 2014. Lam has international experience with the New Zealand Sevens. Since 2017 he has played for the Hurricanes.

Personal
Lam was born in Auckland, a nephew of rugby player Pat Lam. He was educated at St Peter's College, where he played rugby in the college First XV and excelled at athletics, principally in the 100 metres (breaking 11 seconds) and 200 metres, as well as the long jump. In Wellington, while giving his services to the Hurricanes franchise, Lam is completing his degree in Geography and Marine Biology and pursues his interest in underwater diving around Breaker Bay. He likes reading and he and other Hurricanes players Ardie Savea, Chris Eves and Blade Thomson have promoted a book club.

References

External links 
 

1991 births
New Zealand rugby union players
New Zealand sportspeople of Samoan descent
Auckland rugby union players
Blues (Super Rugby) players
Rugby union wings
Rugby union players from Auckland
People educated at St Peter's College, Auckland
Living people
New Zealand international rugby sevens players
Commonwealth Games rugby sevens players of New Zealand
Rugby sevens players at the 2014 Commonwealth Games
Commonwealth Games medallists in rugby sevens
Commonwealth Games silver medallists for New Zealand
Hurricanes (rugby union) players
Wellington rugby union players
Union Bordeaux Bègles players
Medallists at the 2014 Commonwealth Games